State Road 309 (NM 309) is a  state highway in the US state of New Mexico. NM 309's western terminus is at Interstate 25 Business (I-25 Bus.) in Belen, and the eastern terminus is at NM 47 east of Belen.

Major intersections

See also

References

309
Transportation in Valencia County, New Mexico